Earl Waldron (born 31 August 1966 in Antigua) is a West Indian cricket player. He has played three first-class matches for the Leeward Islands. He also played four List A matches for the Leewards, and nine for Antigua & Barbuda, including one match in the 1998 Commonwealth Games cricket tournament.

References
Cricket Archive profile

Commonwealth Games competitors for Antigua and Barbuda
Cricketers at the 1998 Commonwealth Games
1966 births
Living people
Antigua and Barbuda cricketers
Leeward Islands cricketers